Anoplonida is a genus of squat lobsters, which are flattened dorsoventrally, in the family Munididae, containing the following species:
 Anoplonida cracentis Baba & de Saint Laurent, 1996
 Anoplonida inermis (Baba, 1994)
 Anoplonida patae Macpherson & Baba, 2006

References

External links

Squat lobsters